James Olson (born Chet Myles Olson; June 27, 1943) is an American philosopher and author. A generalist focused on psychological aspects of the brain, neuropsychology, Olson explores the brain's role in influencing the nature of human consciousness, thought, and behavior. In particular, he seeks to understand how genetic dominance and functional lateralization combine to create a series of inheritable default brain-operating systems to help guide perception and response. Olson is the author of How Whole Brain Thinking Can Save the Future (Origin Press, 2017), a book that seeks to explain human behavior by focusing on functional differences in the brain's hemispheres in terms of how they view and manage the information that generates our thoughts, feelings, and actions; and       The Whole-Brain Path to Peace (Origin Press, 2011), which promotes peace though whole-brain thinking. To explore the brain's role in our decision-making and behavior, Olson studies the character of the macro management systems that oversee the brain's operation, explaining how the various systems help shape our viewpoint, bias our perception, and divide us.

As shared in Olson’s speaking engagements and radio interviews,<ref>[http://lifemasteryradio.net/?p=3132 Life Mastery Radio] interview with Todd Allen, August 7, 2012.</ref> his passion is to help bring a greater measure of peace to this planet by reducing the level of conflict created by dysfunctional polarizations. Olson believes that mental conflict is initiated in the brain/mind complex, the result of profound differences in the left and right hemisphere as expressed though the unique viewpoints and ideas that they generate. According to Olson, the perceptual and ideological conflicts that arise and divide us can often be consciously eliminated by recognizing the two hemispheres and their operating systems as a complementary whole rather than as parts.

Early life
Olson was born in Kansas City, Missouri. He grew up on a farm near Waynoka, Oklahoma, and was an active 4-H member.Oklahoma 4-H Hall of Fame, 1961.

A former church deacon,Mayflower Congregational Church, Oklahoma City, OK, 1994–1997. Olson began with a core of  conservative Christian values, which were later complemented by the study of other religions and the acquisition of more liberal values as a result of having lived in Paris, France, Vienna, Austria, Murnau, Germany,  Schwäbisch Hall, Germany, and Iserlohn, Germany.

After attending Oklahoma State University, Stillwater from 1961-1963, and the University of Vienna, Austria in 1963, Olson graduated with a Bachelor of Business Administration degree from the University of Oklahoma, Norman. In 1967 he attended graduate school at the University of Missouri-Kansas City.

Current, ongoing work
Olson currently promotes whole-brain thinking and works to reduce social and political polarization in order to create a more peaceful world. The scientific foundation of his published works starts with the split-brain research of Roger Walcott Sperry and his then student Michael S. Gazzaniga, and includes the work of Ned Herrmann, Iain McGilchrist, Robert Ornstein, and Jill Bolte Taylor.

Olson's approach is interdisciplinary, focused on fundamentals, and inclusive of physical, mental, and spiritual values. To explain the brain's role in feeding consciousness, he describes sixteen variations in how the brain gathers and processes information and informs our response. Focused on practical aspects of brain science, Olson works to understand how we can consciously interact with and influence this activity.

The foundation of Olson's philosophical and scientific research starts with a knowledge of the complementary systems that manage the operation of the two hemispheres, one a dual system (as expressed by ontological dualism), the other a nondual system. He explores how the two hemispheric systems relate to one another, seeking to understand the nature of the mental viewpoints they give us, and why they elicit the responses they do. Having studied each hemisphere's viewpoint (the view it shows us) and its typical response (its default reaction to what it perceives), Olson then set out to explain in detail the differences between left-brain and right-brain consciousness, resulting in his latest book How Whole Brain Thinking Can Save the Future (2017) which outlines his four- and sixteen-variation models of consciousness.

Four-part brain-management model

In researching for his 2017 book, Olson found that the dual consciousness discovered by Roger Sperry (for which Sperry won a Nobel Prize in 1981) [9], is a consequence of genetic dominance, specifically, genetic complete dominance, which produces the left-hemisphere- or right-hemisphere-dominant model of consciousness advocated by Sperry. Based on patterns common to genetic dominance, Olson hypothesizes that genetic co-dominance causes the two hemisphere to work as an integrated team to inform consciousness, and genetic incomplete dominance causes the two hemispheres to integrate into a hybrid system of operation.

Brain operating systems and gender

Olson views gender as a consequence of systems behavior. The specialized management systems that operate the hemispheres, like all management systems, can be described based on their operational characteristics. All systems, he points out, are characterized by their purpose and scope, and by the values they adhere to and promote, among other things. Based on a broad body of research detailing the brain's operation, Olson believes that in most people the left hemisphere uses a dual system of operation and the right hemisphere uses a nondual system. The brain’s dual and nondual systems engage in a variety of different tasks and in doing so produce different feelings, and gender is, in part, felt. Dualistic consciousness is aggressive, materialistic, selfish, and fearful. It feels masculine. Holistic nondual consciousness is passive, people oriented, selfless, and loving in character. It feels feminine.

Gender's four variations

Considering common genetic dominance patterns of behavior, Olson believes that some of us experience a combination gender. Whereas genetic complete dominance produces either masculine or feminine gender, genetic co-dominance can be expected to create a team-based operating system that, by default, produces a bisexual gender experience; and genetic incomplete dominance can be expected to give us a hybrid operating system that defaults to produce a hybrid gender variation that produces polysexual behavior.

Sixteen variations in consciousness

Olson claims to have resolved a major conflict between lateralization of brain function studies and handedness studies. The body of behavioral studies that form the foundation of functional lateralization suggest that most women are right-brain dominant; however, handedness studies indicate that most women are left-brain dominant since most women are right-handed, and right-handedness is widely accepted to be a reflection of left-brain dominance. To explain this apparent inconsistency, Olson contends that our information processes in two stages, first as brain input, then as brain output, and that each stage is independently subject to the regulation of one of the three types of genetic dominance. Thus, in accordance with most functional lateralization studies, it is common for women to be informed of their world though a dominant right hemisphere, and yet respond to this information from a dominant left hemisphere—as indicated by handedness studies. Furthermore, Olson claims that any one of the four responses described above (right-hemisphere dominance, left-hemisphere dominance, right-left hybrid, or right and left team), may dominate the processing of information input and any one of the four may dominate the processing of its output. Consequently, Olson believes that current brain science supports sixteen different systems of brain operation that produce sixteen variations in consciousness.

In July, 2012, Olson published a research paper on the topic of sexual orientation with a table showing 32 variations in sexual orientation, “The Role of Brain Dominance in Sexual Orientation”, that has garnered critical media recognition in traditional and LGBTQ"The Brain's Role in Sexual Orientation" Guest Opinion by James Olson in The Bay Area Reporter Online, July 26, 2012. outlets, based on the prevailing controversies around the topic of sexual orientation.

Following the unifying guidelines of philosophy and drawing on his wide-ranging education, Olson has stated that his mission is to help bring the planet’s masculine and feminine energies into greater balance, and therefore into a more peaceful state, through his advocacy of whole-brain thinking.

Previous career
From 1968 – 1987, James Olson worked in agriculture in Woods County, Oklahoma, managing a farm producing wheat and alfalfa.

AwardsHow Whole Brain Thinking Can Save the Future (2017) is the recipient of several book awards:
 Montaigne Medal 2017
 Foreword Reviews Book of the Year, Body, Mind, Spirit—Gold, 2016
 Nautilus Book Award, Science, Cosmology, & Expanding Consciousness—Silver, 2016
 Independent Publisher Book Award, Psychology/Mental Health—Silver, 2017
 Best Book Awards, Science—Gold, 2017
 Best Book Awards, LGBTQ Non-Fiction—Finalist, 2017
 Living Now Evergreen Book Medals, World Peace—Gold, 2019

Awards for The Whole-Brain Path to Peace (2011) include:
 Foreword Reviews Book of the Year Awards, Philosophy—Gold, 2011

Works

"Using Brain Science to Enhance Creativity", article in Common Ground, May, 2017

"The Role of Sacred Geometry in Informing Us", article in Spirituality & Health, March 27, 2017

"The Divine Feminine - As Above So Below", article in Spirituality & Health, March 5, 2017

"How the Split Brain Affects Our Political Observations", article in Spirituality & Health, Jan 29, 2017

"How Whole Brain Thinking Can Save the Future", article in Om Times, Jan 14, 2017

"Evolve Into Your Ultimate Self With Whole Brain Thinking". article in Spirituality & Health, Jan 8, 2017

How Whole Brain Thinking Can Save the Future: Why Left Hemisphere Dominance Has Brought Humanity to the Brink of Disaster and How We Can Think Our Way to Peace and Healing, Origin Press, 2017

"Politics with Half a Brain", article in Whole Life Times, August 7, 2016

The Whole-Brain Path to Peace: The Role of Left- and Right-Brain Dominance in the Polarization and Reunification of America, Origin Press, 2011

“The Role of Brain Dominance in Sexual Orientation”, article, July, 2012

“The Holistic Perspective is the Path to Peace”, article in Wisdom Magazine, Summer 2011

“The Brain's Role in Sexual Orientation”, Guest Opinion in The Bay Area Reporter Online, July 26, 2012

“Our Brains on Peace”, article in Light of Consciousness'' magazine, Spring 2012

Jesus One: The Life and Wisdom of Jesus in Scripture, Spiritwarrior Publishing Company, 1981

Jesus Two: The Life and Wisdom of Jesus, Spiritwarrior Publishing Company, 1982

References

External links
 Official website, The Whole Brain Path to Peace
 YouTube video explanation of Olson's book How Whole Brain Thinking Can Save the Future
 YouTube video explains how genetic dominance and functional lateralization generate a series of four fundamental brain-operating systems
 YouTube video explains how genetic dominance and functional lateralization generate 16 brain-operating-system combinations
 YouTube video explains how genetic dominance and functional lateralization produce four genders

American philosophers
1943 births
Living people